The Sarawak layer cake, known as kek lapis Sarawak (meaning "Sarawak layer cake") or kek lapis moden Sarawak in Malay, is a layered cake from the state of Sarawak in Malaysia. 

This cake can be found almost everywhere in the Malaysian state of Sarawak. Usually Kek Lapis Sarawak will be served on special occasions. They are often baked for religious or cultural celebrations such as Eid ul-Fitr, Christmas, Deepavali, Gawai, birthdays and weddings. 

People in Malaysia practice an open house tradition during any festival day, and the modern layered cakes may be served almost everywhere in Sarawak.

History
The Sarawak layer cake has its origin in a form of layer cake with various spices found in Indonesia called lapis legit or kek lapis Betawi (Betawi refers to Batavia, the old name of Jakarta). This spiced Betawi cake is thought to have been derived from a form of European spit cake, which was made by the wives of Dutch administrators in Batavia during the colonial period and served during evening tea. It is believed that this type of spiced layer cake was introduced to Sarawak in the 1970s and 1980s by Betawis from Jakarta. The Sarawak people then added new ingredients, flavour and colour that resulted in a new version of the layer cake being introduced and named as Sarawak layer cake. In addition, modern Sarawak layered cakes were inspired by Western cake-making in the early 1980s, later modern design to the traditional layer cake, along with new flavours were introduced.

Characteristics
Sarawakian modern layered cakes can be divided into two categories: cakes with ordinary layers and cakes with patterns, motifs, or shapes. All must have at least two colours. The cake can be baked in an oven or microwave. The batter uses butter, margarine or vegetable oil, milk and eggs, and requires a strong arm or electric mixer to be properly prepared. The baked cake has a high, firm texture and the layers are fastened together with jam or a similarly sticky sweet substance. More detailed cakes often require special moulds to maintain the perfect layer thickness.

Protected geographical indication
In Malaysia, kek lapis Sarawak (Sarawak layer cake) has been a protected geographical indication since 2010. This means that any product may only be called "kek lapis Sarawak/Sarawak layer cake" if it is manufactured in Sarawak according to the specifications of the Sarawak Layer Cake Manufacturers Association. It is illegal to label a similarly-manufactured cake "kek lapis Sarawak/Sarawak layer cake" if it is not actually made in Sarawak, and strictly speaking, producers outside the state may only legally name their products "Sarawak-style" layer cake.

References

Malaysian cuisine
Layer cakes